Robert Andrew "Robin" Inskip, 2nd Viscount Caldecote  (8 October 1917 – 20 September 1999) was a British peer and engineer.

The son of Thomas Inskip, 1st Viscount Caldecote, Inskip succeeded to the Viscountcy on the death of his father in 1947. Educated at Eton and King's College, Cambridge, he served in the RNVR during World War II gaining the DSC. When peace returned he was a Lecturer in Electrical Engineering at Cambridge University and after that Managing Director of English Electric Aviation. He was instrumental in setting up the British Aircraft Corporation and also Chairman of the Delta Metal Company and Investors in Industry. Additionally he was President of the Fellowship of Engineering, Chairman of the Crown Appointments Committee and Pro-Chancellor of the Cranfield Institute of Technology. His wife died in 2009.

Arms

References

External links

Independent obituary

1917 births
People educated at Eton College
Fellows of King's College, Cambridge
Knights Commander of the Order of the British Empire
Royal Naval Volunteer Reserve personnel of World War II
Recipients of the Distinguished Service Cross (United Kingdom)
Electrical engineering academics
English chief executives
People associated with Cranfield University
Fellows of the Royal Academy of Engineering
Presidents of the Royal Academy of Engineering
1999 deaths
Viscounts Caldecote
20th-century English businesspeople